The 2005–06 season was Paris Saint-Germain's 36th season in existence. PSG played their home league games at the Parc des Princes in Paris, registering an average attendance of 40,485 spectators per match. The club was presided by Pierre Blayau. The team was coached by Laurent Fournier until 27 December 2005, when Guy Lacombe replaced him. Pauleta was the team captain.

Players

As of the 2005–06 season.

Squad

Left club during season

Competitions

Overview

Ligue 1

League table

Results summary

Results by match

Matches

Coupe de France

Coupe de la Ligue

References

External links

Official websites
PSG.FR - Site officiel du Paris Saint-Germain
Paris Saint-Germain - Ligue 1 
Paris Saint-Germain - UEFA.com

Paris Saint-Germain
Paris Saint-Germain F.C. seasons